Kurşunlu, Antalya is a village in the District of Antalya, Antalya Province, Turkey. The village is located nearby the Kurşunlu Waterfall Nature Park.

References

Villages in Antalya District